Sartù di riso (or rice sartù) is a typical dish of Neapolitan cuisine. It is prepared with rice seasoned with ragù, peas, pancetta, mushrooms, fior di latte or provola, meatballs, sausages, boiled eggs and, traditionally, with chicken livers. The whole is baked and then turned out before being served.

It can be presented both in the sauce version, with ragù, and in white, without it.

History 
Rice, a product imported by the Aragonese in the Kingdom of Naples, did not find success in South Italy - except in  Sicily, where it was introduced by the Arabs. It was adopted by the Salerno School of Medicine and prescribed as a cure for the sick, but not by the people, who preferred pasta. The sartù was probably born from the need to adapt this dish to the taste of the court, under the influence of the Austrian queen Maria Carolina of Austria. The monsù, French court cooks, created this dish in the eighteenth century, enriching the rice with numerous ingredients and masking the flavor with tomato sauce. The very name of the dish would come from the French surtout, the centerpiece that was used in the eighteenth century and that could also be used to bring the sartù to the table, cooked like a timballo.

Additional images

References 

Neapolitan cuisine
Rice dishes
Tomato dishes
Meat dishes
Bacon dishes
Sausage dishes